This article lists all power stations in Eritrea with more than 0.5 MW installed capacity. In addition, smaller stations do exist and small off-grid stations as well.

Wind

Thermal

See also 
 List of power stations in Africa
 List of largest power stations in the world

References 

Eritrea
Power stations